Vayalar Ravi (born 4 June 1937) is an Indian politician, who served as the Union Minister of Overseas Indian Affairs from 2006 to 2014. He is a  former member of the Rajya Sabha.

Political life
Ravi was born in Vayalar, Cherthala, Alappuzha District, Kerala. He was the first General Secretary of the Kerala Students Union (KSU), the students' wing of Indian National Congress in Kerala. Ravi was elected to the 5th Lok Sabha in 1971 from Chirayinkil in Thiruvananthapuram district; he was re-elected to the 6th Lok Sabha in 1977, serving until 1979. He was elected to the Kerala Legislative Assembly in 1982, and he served as Home Minister of Kerala from 1982 to 1986 before resigning from that position due to a disagreement with Chief Minister K. Karunakaran. He was re-elected to the Kerala Legislative Assembly in 1987, serving until 1991. He was elected to the Rajya Sabha in July 1994 and again in April 2003. He became Union Cabinet Minister for Overseas Affairs on 30 January 2006.

After the Congress reelection in 2009, Ravi was re-inducted to the Cabinet for the second UPA government and retained the portfolio of Overseas Indian Affairs. He was given the additional responsibility of Ministry of Civil Aviation on 19 January 2011. He resigned from the office after Rashtriya Lok Dal leader Ajit Singh succeeded him.

Personal life
Ravi met his wife Mercy, while they were both active in the Kerala Students Union and he married her after a brief courtship. Mercy Ravi died on 5 September 2009 following a kidney failure, aged 64.

In February 2010, Vayalar Ravi along with Indian Ambassador Shamma Jain were injured in a car accident in Monrovia, Liberia, while on an official visit to African countries.

References

External links

 ambedkar.org
 Deshmukh's portfolios given to Vayalar Ravi

|-

|-

|-

|-

|-

|-

Members of the Cabinet of India
Malayali politicians
1937 births
Living people
Indian National Congress politicians from Kerala
India MPs 1971–1977
India MPs 1977–1979
Rajya Sabha members from Kerala
People from Alappuzha district
Lok Sabha members from Kerala
Kerala MLAs 1987–1991
Kerala MLAs 1982–1987
Civil aviation ministers of India
Indian National Congress (U) politicians